PKMS may refer to:

 Pertubuhan Kebangsaan Melayu Singapura (Singapore Malay National Organisation), a political party in Singapore
 Pui Kiu Middle School, Quarry Bay, Hong Kong